Alexander H Browne is a documentary film and television producer, noted for his work on "Grant", "My Next Guest Needs No Introduction With David Letterman and the sports documentary A League of Ordinary Gentlemen.

Upon graduating from Colgate in May 2002 with a BA in History,  Browne teamed up with brother/director Christopher Browne and served as lead producer on the feature-length documentary A League of Ordinary Gentlemen. Browne later went on to produce and co-direct the 2010 film After The Cup: Sons of Sakhnin United.

References

American documentary film producers
Living people
Year of birth missing (living people)